Sofiane Khadda (born 23 December 1991) is a French professional footballer, of Algerian descent, who plays as a midfielder.

Professional career
Khadda made his professional debut for LB Châteauroux in a 3–2 Ligue 2 win over Stade Brestois 29, wherein he scored the winner in extra time.

On 6 August 2018, Khadda moves to the Greek Super League club Xanthi.

References

External links
 
 
 

1991 births
Living people
Sportspeople from Vesoul
Association football midfielders
French footballers
French sportspeople of Algerian descent
LB Châteauroux players
Xanthi F.C. players
Ligue 2 players
Championnat National 3 players
Championnat National 2 players
Championnat National players
Super League Greece players
French expatriate footballers
Expatriate footballers in Greece
Footballers from Bourgogne-Franche-Comté
French expatriate sportspeople in Greece